Stealth Communications is an American fiber-based Internet service provider (ISP), installing and maintaining its own fiber optic network throughout New York City. Stealth began rolling out its Gigabit Internet services in late 2013 to businesses throughout Manhattan, using in-house employees to lay its own fiber-optic cabling. In July 2015, City of New York and Stealth announced a $5.3 million public/private partnership to expand fiber broadband into the Brooklyn and Queens Industrial Business Zones. As of May 2019, the company reported to have connected hundreds of commercial properties with fiber, over 80 fiber route miles.

Overview
Stealth Communications started in 1995 to provide ultrafast Internet connectivity to businesses in NYC. In 2013 the company received authorization from the City of New York to construct its own fiber network.

Technology

Fiber distribution
Stealth utilizes an underground conduit system for placing its fiber-optic cables, that is owned and maintained by Empire City Subway. Once their fiber-optic cable reaches the closest manhole to the building, Stealth pulls the fiber-optic cable through existing conduits or builds a new conduit into the building. In certain cases due to the conditions of the conduit system, conduits are clogged or collapsed often causing costly re-routing by lengthy distances and construction of entirely new conduits.

Fiber technology
Stealth implements WDM fiber transmission technology for connecting customers to its hubs, by allocating a wavelength for each customer, whereas each wavelength is capable of transmitting between 1 Gbit/s to 100 Gbit/s. The company claims that it makes use of special materials to split and combine multiple wavelengths running through the fiber-optic cables without requiring electricity.

References

External links 
 Official company site

Internet service providers of the United States
Companies based in New York City
New York City infrastructure
American companies established in 1995
Telecommunications companies established in 1995
Telecommunications companies of the United States